The MPI MP14B is a low-emissions diesel switcher locomotive built by MotivePower.

The MPI MP14B is nearly identical to the MPI MP21B except that it has one fewer engine.

See also 
 Genset locomotive

References

External links 

MPI Genset Locomotive Rosters – Information and resource site for low-emission switcher locomotives built by Motive Power Industries.

B-B locomotives
MPI locomotives
Railway locomotives introduced in 2008
Diesel-electric locomotives of the United States
EPA Tier 2-compliant locomotives of the United States
Amtrak locomotives
Standard gauge locomotives of the United States